Ahmad Zakii Anwar (born 1955 in Johor state, Malaysia) is a prominent and highly regarded artist in Malaysia.

Early life and education
Zakii was born in Johor Bahru, Johor, in Malaysia. He is the youngest of 6 children. Zakii developed his love for art at the age of 6.  He attended Ngee Heng Primary School from 1962 until 1967 and went to secondary school at English College Johore Bahru. After graduation, Zakii was accepted into the School of Art and Design, MARA Institute of Technology.

Family
Zakii's father, Tan Sri Haji Anwar bin Abdul Malik, was a politician. He was credited as the person who gave the United Malays National Organisation (UMNO) its name – initially United Malays Organization. This was at a meeting in Batu Pahat when seven UMNO founders from Johor Bahru met Datuk Onn Jaafar to call for a unification of the disparate Malay nationalist groups at the time. He later became Onn’s private secretary when Onn became Johor’s chief minister. Anwar's mother was Hajjah Saodah binti Abdullah, a housewife.  Zakii has two elder sisters, Tan Sri Zarinah Anwar, who was the chairman of Securities Commission Malaysia and Zainah Anwar, prominent Malaysian non-governmental organisation leader and activist. She was the head of Sisters in Islam for more than twenty years before deciding to step down to give way to young blood to continue the fight for Muslim women's rights. Their father died in 1998, and their mother, Hajjah Saodah bte Abdullah, died the following year. Zakii is married with 4 children.

Career
The artist began his career as a graphic artist, producing some of the leading advertising graphics of his time. From there, he continued to establish his name by converting to fine art where his techniques have been exemplary and world class.
Zakii came to attention for his virtuosity and command of a spectrum of media from charcoals to oils, building a reputation for stunning photo-realist still-life paintings and expressive portraits. Later, a more contemporary edge surfaced in his works as Zakii introduced urban subjects and settings into his canvases. He is lauded for capturing not just city motifs and urban features but also a distinctive psychological dimension and cinematic quality in these scenarios. Zakii's preoccupation with the spiritual or metaphysical aspects of urban life, as seen through his use of icons, symbols and allegories (including metaphors of theatre, performance and masks) have also marked his practice.

Some of Zakii's exhibitions include:

Solo exhibitions

1997| One Man Show, Valentine Willie Fine Art, Kuala Lumpur, Malaysia
1998| Distant Gamelan, Art Focus, Singapore
1999| Presence, Barbara Greene Fine Art, New York, United States
2000| Stills, Taksu, Kuala Lumpur, Malaysia
2001| Shadowland, Plum Blossoms, Hong Kong
2003| Interpreter of Desires, Taksu Kuala Lumpur, Malaysia
2004| Borobudor, Amanjiwo, Jogjakarta, Indonesia  | Arangbali, Taksu Jakarta, Indonesia
2005| Primordial Dream, Singapore Tyler Print Institute, Singapore Icons | Icons, Richard Koh Fine Art, Kuala Lumpur, Malaysia
2006| Subliminal, The Drawing Room, Manila, Philippines | Numthong Gallery, Bangkok, Thailand
2007| Ahmad Zakii Anwar: Paintings, Drawings & Prints 1991 – 2007, Singapore Tyler Print Institute, Singapore | Kota Sunyi: Solo Exhibition by Ahmad Zakii Anwar  | CP Foundation, CP ArtSpace, Jakarta, Indonesia
2008| Disclosure: A Mid-Career Survey, GALERI PETRONAS, Kuala Lumpur | Drawings, Sketches & Studies, Richard Koh Fine Art, Kuala Lumpur | Gimme Shelter, 19 Jalan Berangan, Kuala Lumpur
2009| Being, NUS Museum, National University of Singapore, Singapore
2010| Nafsu, Nadi Gallery, Jakarta, Indonesia
2011| Bones and Sinews, AndrewShire Gallery, Los Angeles, United States
2012| Kota Sepi, Valentine Willie Fine Art, Kuala Lumpur, Malaysia

Group exhibitions

Kuala Lumpur
Singapore
Vietnam
Macau
Bali
Perth, Western Australia
Beijing
Cheltenham
Fukuoka
Prum
Los Angeles

Further reading

References

Malaysian painters
Living people
1955 births
Malaysian people of Malay descent
Malaysian people of Ethiopian descent
Malaysian people of Javanese descent
Malaysian people of Arab descent
Malaysian Muslims
People from Johor Bahru